Michael Williams (born 6 February 1965) is a Welsh former professional footballer who played in The Football League for Chester City and Wrexham as both a defender and a midfielder.

Playing career
Williams had been with Everton as a schoolboy before playing for Hawarden Rangers, where he was spotted by Chester coach Cliff Sear. He made his Football League debut on 8 May 1982 in a 2–1 home defeat to Lincoln City in the number eight shirt. He had spells in and out of the first–team over the next two years, in a side that contained fellow homegrown youngsters such as Paul Blackwell, Peter Bulmer and Peter Zelem.

He made his final appearance for Chester against Bristol City on 7 May 1984 before he was released by manager John McGrath. During his time at Chester, Williams and teammate John Allen had been set to join Chelsea on trial with a view to permanent transfers, but the deals collapsed after Williams was stretchered off in a match against Hartlepool United.

He quickly joined Chester's arch rivals Wrexham, where he quickly established himself in the first-team side. Over the next six years, Williams went on to make 238 first-team appearances for the North Wales club, helping them win the Welsh Cup against Kidderminster Harriers in 1985–86. His final game for the club came in a European Cup Winners Cup tie against Manchester United in October 1990, with a persistent knee injury forcing him to retire from playing the following year.

On 7 April 1992, a testimonial match for Williams was staged between Wrexham and Chester City. A crowd of 1,984 saw a 1–1 draw between Williams' two former clubs.

Honours

Wrexham

Welsh Cup winners: 1985–86.

References

External links
 

1965 births
Living people
Sportspeople from Flintshire
Welsh footballers
English Football League players
Association football midfielders
Association football defenders
Chester City F.C. players
Wrexham A.F.C. players
Association football utility players